The marquess Giacomo Arditi of Castelvetere (21 March 1815, in Presicce – July 1891) was an Italian historian, economist and writer, nephew of the archaeologist Michele Arditi.

Overview 
Giacomo Arditi is best known for his work La Corografia fisica et storica della provincia di Terra d'Otranto, the most ponderous encyclopedic work that has ever succeeded to provide a complete portrait of the province of Salento, the unification of Italy, and the proclamation of Rome as the capital of the Kingdom of Italy. Arditi was the member of numerous academies, member of the Archaeological Commission of the province of Lecce, being royal inspector of antiquities and monuments, President of the Provincial Deputation and Vice-intendent of the District of Gallipoli.

Works 
 La Corografia fisica et storica della provincia di Terra d'Otranto (1849)
 La Leuca Salentina (1875)

Notes 

Italian economists
Italian male non-fiction writers
Italian nobility
1815 births
1891 deaths
19th-century Italian historians
19th-century Italian male writers